Mykola Mykolaiovych Szczerbak (also Nikolai Nikolayevich, also Shcherbak; ; 31 October 1927 – 27 January 1998) was a Ukrainian zoologist and ecologist, a prolific herpetologist, a full professor and a Corresponding Member of the National Academy of Sciences of Ukraine.

Described species of reptiles 
Darevskia lindholmi 
Eremias kopetdaghica 
Eremias andersoni 
Tenuidactylus turcmenicus 
Teratoscincus rustamowi 
Altiphylax levitoni 
Altiphylax mintoni 
Altiphylax tokobajevi 
Eremias afghanistanica 
Gekko badenii 
Cyrtodactylus paradoxus

Species of reptiles named in honor of Prof. Szczerbak
Darevskia szczerbaki 
Alsophylax szczerbaki 
Eremias szczerbaki  
Emydocephalus szczerbaki

References
Memorial website
To the 80 anniversary - biography (2007)
Memorial page on the website of Schmalhausen Institute of Zoology
Citations in Google Scholar

Members of the National Academy of Sciences of Ukraine
20th-century Ukrainian zoologists
Soviet zoologists
Soviet herpetologists
1927 births
1998 deaths